The Hirsihorn (also known as Pointe de la Forcletta) is a mountain of the Swiss Pennine Alps, located east of Ayer in the canton of Valais. It lies between the valleys of Anniviers and Turtmann, north of the Forcletta pass.

References

External links
 Hirsihorn on Hikr

Mountains of the Alps
Alpine three-thousanders
Mountains of Switzerland
Mountains of Valais